Rosemary P Goodchild (born 1936) is an English former cricketer who played primarily as a pace bowler. She appeared in one Test match for England in 1966. She played domestic cricket for Yorkshire, Warwickshire, Buckinghamshire and Thames Valley. 

During her one test match, played against New Zealand, Goodchild opened the bowling alongside June Stephenson in both innings, and took two wickets. She batted at number ten for England, and was unbeaten without scoring in the first innings, and made one run in the second innings. The match was drawn.

References

External links
 
 

1936 births
Living people
England women Test cricketers
Yorkshire women cricketers
Warwickshire women cricketers
Buckinghamshire women cricketers
Thames Valley women cricketers